Memento is the debut studio album by French trumpeter Soel. It was released in 2003 through Warner Jazz France. Recording sessions took place at Magic House Studio in Paris, France. Production of the album was solely handled by St Germain. It features contribution from Tori Robinson, Clem Ashford and Chris Henry on vocals, Didier Davidas on keyboards, Alex Legrand and Frantz Calcul on guitar, Mike Clinton on bass, Edmundo Carneiro on percussion, Edouard Labor on saxophone and flute, Rachid Mouna on baritone saxophone, and Edivandro Borges on trombone.

The album peaked at number 63 in Belgium, at number 107 in France, and at number 16 on the UK Jazz & Blues Albums.

Track listing

Sample credits
Track 1 contains elements from "Chitterlings Con Carne" by Pucho & The Latin Soul Brothers
Track 3 contains elements from "Joy" by Isaac Hayes
Track 4 contains elements from "Jericho Jerk" by Michel Colombier and Pierre Henry
Track 5 contains elements from "Black Woman" by The Last Poets, "Runnin'" by Edwin Starr, "Jericho Jerk" by Michel Colombier and Pierre Henry
Track 9 contains elements from "Been Done Already" by The Last Poets

Personnel
Pascal Ohsé – main artist, trumpet
Victoria "Tori" Robinson – vocals
Clement "Clem" Ashford – vocals
Chris Henry – vocals
Didier Davidas – keyboards
Frantz Calcul – guitar
Alex Legrand – guitar
Mike Clinton – bass
Edmundo Carneiro – percussion
Edouard Labor – saxophone, flute
Rachid Mouna – baritone saxophone
Edivandro Borges – trombone
Ludovic Navarre – producer, mixing, presenter
Pompon Finkelstein – mastering

Chart history

References

External links

Memento by Soel on iTunes

2003 debut albums
Pascal Ohsé albums
Warner Records albums